is a Japanese manga series written and illustrated by Kousuke Yasuda. It has been serialized in Hakusensha's seinen manga magazine Young Animal since September 2020.

Publication
Written and illustrated by Kousuke Yasuda, I Get the Feeling That Nobukuni-san Likes Me started in Hakusensha's seinen manga magazine Young Animal on September 25, 2020. Hakusensha has collected its chapters into individual tankōbon volumes. The first volume was released on April 28, 2021. As of November 29, 2022, four volumes have been released.

In North America, the manga has been licensed for English release by Seven Seas Entertainment, with the first volume set to be published on November 29, 2022.

Volume list

References

Further reading

External links
 

Hakusensha manga
Romantic comedy anime and manga
Seinen manga
Seven Seas Entertainment titles
Slice of life anime and manga